The 1951 Western Kentucky Hilltoppers football team represented Western Kentucky State College (now known as Western Kentucky University) as a member of the Ohio Valley Conference (OVC) during the 1951 college football season. Led by fourth-year head coach Jack Clayton, the Hilltoppers compiled an overall record of 4–5 with a mark of 2–4 in conference play, placing sixth in the OVC. The team's captain was Lawrence "Butch" Gilbert.

Schedule

References

Western Kentucky
Western Kentucky Hilltoppers football seasons  
Western Kentucky Hilltoppers football